Sir Dormer George (Bob) Andrews (8 April 1919 – 28 June 2004) was a judge and Chief Justice of the Supreme Court of Queensland, Australia.

Education and military service
Andrews was born in Brisbane. He attended Taringa State primary school and St Joseph's College, Nudgee before enrolling  at the University of Queensland in 1939.  In 1940 he enlisted in the Royal Air Force, first in No. 61 OTU in Britain and then in No. 127 Squadron in the Western Desert.  In October 1942 the Hurricane fighter he was flying was shot down and he sustained severe injuries that resulted in the loss of his left arm.  He was held prisoner by the Italians until he was liberated and repatriated in June 1943.

He resumed his university study and graduated with a Bachelor of Arts in 1944 and a Bachelor of Law in 1947.

Legal career
He did articles at the firm of Williams and Williams, was admitted as a barrister in 1947. He practised at the Queensland bar for the next 11 years.

He was appointed a judge on the District Court of Queensland in April 1959 and as a judge of the Supreme Court of Queensland in May 1971.

In 1982, although he was only the ninth most senior justice in the court, he was the choice of the premier, Joh Bjelke-Petersen, for the post of Chief Justice.  This choice was strongly opposed in cabinet by the Liberal Party, and Walter Campbell was appointed as a compromise candidate.

In 1985 Campbell left the Supreme Court to take up an appointment as state governor and Andrews was appointed Chief Justice.

He retired in 1989 when he reached the statutory retirement age of 70.

Honours
Andrews was appointed a Knight Bachelor in 1987 and received the Centenary Medal in 2001.

See also
 Judiciary of Australia
 List of Judges of the Supreme Court of Queensland

References

1919 births
2004 deaths
Chief Justices of Queensland
Australian Knights Bachelor
Recipients of the Centenary Medal
Judges of the Supreme Court of Queensland
20th-century Australian judges